Gitana (English: Gypsy) may refer to:
Gitana, alternate name of Gitanae, an ancient Greek city
Gitana, Romani people in Spain
Gitana, a series of 17 boats originating with Gitana (1876), now operated by Gitana Team

Music
Gitana (album), a 1987 album released by Mexican singer Daniela Romo
"Gitana", a song from the album
"Gitana", a song by Puerto Rican-American musician Willie Colón
"Gitana", a song by Maná on the album Falta Amor
"Gitana", a song by Wisin on the album El Sobreviviente
"Gitana", the Spanish version of "Gypsy" by Shakira
"Alma de Gitana", a song by Ednita Nazario from the album Tú Sin Mí
"Gitana", a harp piece by Alphonse Hasselmans